Jakes Run is an unincorporated community in Monongalia County, West Virginia, United States.

The community takes its name from nearby Jakes Run.

References 

Unincorporated communities in West Virginia
Unincorporated communities in Monongalia County, West Virginia